Josh Thompson (born October 20, 1998) is an American football cornerback for the Tennessee Titans of the National Football League (NFL). He played college football at Texas.

Early years
Thompson attended Nacogdoches High School in Nacogdoches, Texas. A 4-star recruit, he committed to Texas to play college football on July 27, 2016. He chose Texas over, among others, Baylor, Kansas State, Minnesota, Mississippi, Missouri, Penn State, and UCLA.

College career
Thompson played at Texas from 2017 to 2021. During his career he had 108 tackles (79 solo), five tackles for loss, two interceptions, one fumble recovery, one touchdown, and seven pass break-ups in 37 games.

Professional career

Jacksonville Jaguars
On May 2, 2022, Thompson signed with the Jacksonville Jaguars as an undrafted free agent following the 2022 NFL Draft. On August 30, 2022, after the final roster cutdown of the preseason, Thompson made the 53-man roster for the 2022 season, but was waived the next day and re-signed to the practice squad.

Tennessee Titans
On October 17, 2022, Thompson was signed by the Tennessee Titans off the Jaguars practice squad. He was placed on injured reserve on November 12, 2022. He was activated on December 10.

References

External links
Jacksonville Jaguars bio
Texas Longhorns bio

Living people
1998 births
People from Nacogdoches, Texas
Players of American football from Texas
American football defensive backs
American football cornerbacks
Texas Longhorns football players
Jacksonville Jaguars players
Tennessee Titans players